Indian Springs Pass, is a mountain pass 40-mi (64 km) northwest of Las Vegas in northwest Clark County, Nevada. 

The pass is in a region of converging landforms of various watersheds, valleys, and mountain ranges; specifically it lies on the north perimeter of the Ivanpah-Pahrump Watershed-(Pahrump Valley). The endorheic Indian Springs Valley watershed lies due north, and the endorheic Three Lakes Valley is adjacent east.

Description of water divide regions 

The following landforms converge at the Indian Springs Pass region:

1–(north)-Pahrump Valley-Spring Mountains, extends due south, (Pahrump Valley, of west watershed)
2–Spring Mountains-SE
3–Indian Springs Valley & Watershed, (endorheic)-N
4–south playas, south Three Lakes Valley (Nevada)-E & SE

The south playas of Three Lakes Valley, are on the northwest, up-basin perimeter of the Las Vegas Valley.

See also 
List of Great Basin Divide border landforms of Nevada

References

Mountain passes of Nevada
Landforms of Clark County, Nevada